Pierre Edouard Leopold Verger, alias Fatumbi or Fátúmbí (4 November 1902, in Paris – 11 February 1996, in Salvador, Brazil) was a photographer, self-taught ethnographer, and babalawo (Yoruba priest of Ifà) who devoted most of his life to the study of the African diaspora — the slave trade, the African-based religions of the new world, and the resulting cultural and economical flows from and to Africa.

Life
At the age of 30, after losing his family, Pierre Verger took up the career of journalistic photographer. Over the next 15 years, he traveled the four continents, documenting many civilizations that would soon be effaced by progress. His destinations included Tahiti (1933); United States, Japan, and China (1934 and 1937); Italy, Spain, Sudan (now Mali), Niger, Upper Volta, Togo and Dahomey (now Benin, 1935); the West Indies (1936); Mexico (1937, 1939, and 1957); the Philippines and Indochina (now Thailand, Laos, Cambodia and Vietnam, 1938); Guatemala and Ecuador (1939); Senegal (as a conscript, 1940); Argentina (1941), Peru and Bolivia (1942 and 1946); and finally Brazil (1946).  His photographs were featured in magazines such as Paris-Soir, Daily Mirror (under the pseudonym of "Mr. Lensman"), Life, and Paris Match, and in 1955 his graphic composition of three women bearing vases of flowers on turbaned heads was selected by curator Edward Steichen for MoMA's 1955 world-touring The Family of Man exhibition, seen by 9 million visitors. 

In the city of Salvador, Brazil he fell in love with the place and people, and decided to stay for good. Having become interested in the local history and culture, he turned from errant photographer to a researcher of the African diaspora in the Americas. His subsequent voyages are focused on that goal: the west coast of Africa and Paramaribo (1948), Haiti (1949), and  Cuba (1957). After studying the Yoruba culture and its influences in Brazil, Verger became an initiate of the Candomblé religion, and officiated at its rituals.  During a visit to Benin, he was initiated into Ifá (ikin divination), became a babalawo (priest) of Orunmila, and was renamed Fátúmbí ("he who is reborn through the Ifá oracle").

Veger's contributions to ethnography are embodied in dozens of conference papers, journal articles and books, and were recognized by Sorbonne University, which conferred upon him a doctoral degree (Docteur 3eme Cycle) in 1966 — quite a feat for someone who dropped out of high school at 17.

Verger  continued to study and document his chosen subject right until his death in Salvador, at the age of 93. During that time he became a professor at the Federal University of Bahia in 1973, where he was responsible for the establishment of the Afro-Brazilian Museum in Salvador; and served as visiting professor at the University of Ifé in Nigeria. The non-profit  in Salvador, which he established to continue his work, holds more than 63,000 photos and negatives taken until 1973, as well as his papers and correspondence.

His life has been documented in a book by Jérôme Souty and a movie.

References

External links
 Dieux D'Afrique - prefaces 
 Pierre Verger Foundation, Salvador 
 Pierre Fatumbi Verger and his works 
 Pierre Fatumbi Verger by Cida Nóbrega 

Photographers from Paris
French emigrants to Brazil
1902 births
1996 deaths
French Candomblés
Babalawos
Academic staff of Obafemi Awolowo University
French ethnographers
French expatriates in the United States
French expatriates in Japan
French expatriates in China
French expatriates in Italy
French expatriates in Spain
French expatriates in Benin
French expatriates in Mexico
French expatriates in Cambodia
French expatriates in Bolivia
French expatriates in Argentina
French expatriates in Guatemala
French expatriates in Ecuador
French expatriates in Thailand
French expatriates in Peru
French expatriates in Niger
French expatriates in Haiti
French expatriates in Senegal
French expatriates in Nigeria
Anthropologists of the Yoruba
20th-century anthropologists
20th-century explorers
20th-century French photographers
Brazilianists
Explorers from Paris